The Jeffries Yacht Club is located along the Massachusetts Bay in Boston, Massachusetts. The club was chartered in 1876, which its members contend makes it the oldest yacht club on the East Coast.

References

1876 establishments in Massachusetts
Clubs and societies in Massachusetts
Sailing in Massachusetts
Sports clubs established in 1876
Sports venues in Boston
Yacht clubs in the United States